The barong is a thick, leaf-shaped, single-edged blade sword. It is a weapon used by Muslim Filipino ethnolinguistic groups like the Tausug, Sama-Bajau, or Yakan in the Southern Philippines.

Description

Blade
Barong blades are thick and very heavy with the weight aiding in the slicing capability of the sword. Barong blade lengths range from 8 to 22 inches (20 to 56 cm) as the average blade length is originally 14 inch. Newer blades, on the other hand, tend to be longer measuring at 18 to 22 inches (46 to 56 cm). Damascene patterns are also thick but again most often not as controlled as the more widely known kalis.

Hilt (handle)
Most handles have a silver sleeve and lacquered braided fiber rings that sit on top. Nobility hilts were made of ivory, carabao horn, or kamagong (Philippine ebony). Other barong swords have less elaborate hilts and are smaller in size. Common motifs include the cockatoo (kakatua) and the sea serpent (naga). The long metal ferrule is most often made of silver, though copper, brass and swaasa is also used. Barongs used in World War II may also have aluminium ferrules. The ferrule tends to be around 8 cm (3 inches) in length. Often the ferrule will have lacquered braided natural fiber rings to aid in grip. Sometimes these fiber rings were on top of the ferrule, but often what would appear to be a solid metal ferrule would in fact be a number of metal bands that alternate between the fiber bands.

Cockatoo pommels tended to be made of banati. Higher end barongs belonging to the upper classes often had large elaborately carved junggayan (elongated) cockatoos. Barong for the lower classes, and the ones used for fighting, have less elaborate cockatoo pommels of much smaller sizes, often featuring de-emphasized crests or beaks (and on fighting versions mere vestigial elements of the crest and beak motifs). At one period near World War II, cockatoo forms changed. Crests became more triangular, and began to emerge directly from the back of the pommel, whereas older cockatoo had crests that flowed from the butt-plain of the pommel. Also, beaks started to become more massive and rectangular in form. Barong used by juramentados, or those who had taken the rite of Magsabil, often would feature smaller blades with normal size hilts.

Scabbard

Older barong scabbards tended only to be partially wrapped with large rattan lashings, while newer barong scabbards feature a full wrap of thin rattan. Also, the scabbards of older barong featured thinner flat boards, whereas post World War II barong scabbards are of much thicker stock, and feature a central ridge line. The terminus on modern-made scabbards tends to turn upward to a more dramatic degree, often at a near 90-degree angle and feature squared tips. As with kris scabbards of the post World War II era, mother of pearl inlays begin to appear at the throat and tips of barong scabbards as well.

See also
Kampilan
Pirah
 Smatchet

References

External links
 Federico's Muslim Swords
 Sandata — The Edged Weapons of the Philippines  by Ian A. Greaves, Jose Albovias Jr. & Federico Malibago:
 Cato, Robert, Moro Swords. Singapore: Graham Bash, 1996.
 Old Blades

Filipino swords
Blade weapons
Weapons of the Philippine Army